Adrianne Wortzel (born 1941) is an American contemporary artist who utilizes robotics in her installations and performances. She has also created many online works.

Early life and education
Wortzel was born in Brooklyn, New York, in 1941. She attended Brooklyn College of the City University of New York, where she studied painting and graduated with a Bachelor of Arts in Fine Arts in 1963. She later continued her education at The School of Visual Arts in New York and received her Master of Fine Arts in Computer Arts in 1996.

Career
Much of Wortzel's early career was as an abstract painter, and was featured in many group and solo exhibitions in several New York galleries, as well as in solo exhibitions at the Stamford Museum and Nature Center in Connecticut. When she returned to school, she began working more with robotics and telerobotics as she pursued her MFA in Computer Art, producing video and installation work, both in galleries and online. Her installation Camouflage Town was shown in the group exhibition Data Dynamics at the Whitney Museum of American Art, where a robot named Kiru was allowed to inhabit the space of the museum and interact with museum visitors both directly and remotely. Another piece, Eliza Redux, was launched in 2008. The installation took Joseph Weizenbaum's ELIZA program and embodied it in a physical robot's form installed in Wortzel's East Village apartment in New York. Participants interacted with the robot through online sessions.

Wortzel has earned several grants and awards in the course of her work, including the National Science Foundation Award for the Robotic Renaissance Project. She has also had her work featured in many art publications, including Margret Lovejoy's Digital Current: Art in the Electronic Age and Frank Popper's  From Technological to Virtual Art, and has been published in major art journals, including Leonardo in 2007. Wortzel was an Eyebeam Resident in 2008.

She has taught at many art educational institutions, including the School of Visual Arts in New York and the Cooper Union. She is currently a professor emeritus in the Departments of Entertainment Technology and Emerging Media Technologies at the New York City College of Technology, after teaching there as a professor from 1998 to 2015.

List of major works
NoMad is an Island, installation, Linz, Austria, 1997
Battle of the Pyramids, installation, Eyebeam Atelier, 2008
Eliza Redux, installation, New York City College of Technology, 2008
Camouflage Town, installation, The Whitney Museum of American Art, 2010
The Veils of Transference, video, 2010
 Solace and Perpetuity, algorithmically derived fictionalized autobiography, 2016

External links
 Adrianne Wortzel's website
 Documentation of Eliza Redux

References

American contemporary artists
Living people
American women artists
Brooklyn College alumni
21st-century American women
Electronic literature writers
1941 births